Thomas More (died 1421) of Gloucester was an English politician.

He was a Member (MP) of the Parliament of England for Gloucester in November 1414, 1415 and 1420.

References

Year of birth missing
1421 deaths
15th-century English people
People from Gloucester
Members of the Parliament of England (pre-1707) for Gloucester